Teiru Kinoshita (born Park Tae-Il on December 17, 1985 in Osaka, Japan) is a Japanese-Korean boxer.

Kinoshita is a former Japanese super flyweight champion.

In 2014, he lost to Zolani Tete for the vacant International Boxing Federation (IBF) super flyweight world title.

He is scheduled to again fight for the IBF super flyweight world title against Jerwin Ancajas on the Manny Pacquiao vs. Jeff Horn undercard.  Kinoshita entered the bout on a six-fight win streak and with the IBF's No. 3 in his weight class.  He is the top ranked contender for the IBF (with the first and second positions vacant).

References

External links

1985 births
Living people
Japanese male boxers
Japanese people of Korean descent
Sportspeople from Osaka
Super-flyweight boxers
Zainichi Korean people